Acusados is a Spanish drama television series created by Ida y Vuelta starring Blanca Portillo and José Coronado, among others. It aired from 2009 to 2010 on Telecinco.

Premise 
Rosa Ballester (Blanca Portillo) is a judge who prosecutes the businessman Joaquín de la Torre (José Coronado) for believing him responsible for a fire in a club. To that end, Ballester requires the services of Jorge Vega (Daniel Grao), who moves from Salamanca to Madrid in order to help with the investigation, unbeknownst the main reason behind the requirement of Ballester is that the latter wants to approach Vega's girlfriend Laura Nieto (Silvia Abascal), supposedly a key piece in the case.

Cast 

Introduced in season 2

Production and release 
Filming started by September 2008 in Salamanca, later moving to Madrid. The series premiered on 28 January 2009. The last episode of the first season aired on 22 April 2009. The second season premiered on 13 January 2010. The broadcasting run of the 26-episode series ended on 22 April 2010, with average figures of 2,128,000 viewers and a 13.4% audience share.

Acusados was reportedly so eerily similar to the American series Damages that Sony Pictures considered to file a plagiarism reclamation.

References 

Telecinco network series
Spanish-language television shows
Television shows filmed in Spain
Television shows set in Castile and León
Television shows set in Madrid
2009 Spanish television series debuts
2010 Spanish television series endings
2000s Spanish drama television series
Psychological thriller television series
Spanish legal drama television series